The Starmus International Festival is an international gathering focused on celebrating astronomy, space exploration, music, art, and other sciences such as biology and chemistry. It was founded by Garik Israelian, an astronomer at the Institute for Astrophysics in Tenerife, Canary Islands, Spain.

The Festival has featured Buzz Aldrin, Neil Armstrong, Richard Dawkins, Stephen Hawking, Neil deGrasse Tyson, Alexei Leonov, Jim Lovell, Brian May, Jill Tarter, David Grinspoon, Lisa Kaltenegger, Kip Thorne, and Rick Wakeman among others.

History 

In 2007, Brian May, founding guitarist of the rock band Queen, completed his PhD dissertation which was left unfinished in 1974 when Queen began to achieve significant success. May's work focused on interplanetary dust clouds in the solar system. He had studied at Tenerife earlier through Imperial College London, and resumed work there more than 30 years later. In 2007, his new co-advisor was Garik Israelian, and the two struck up a friendship because Israelian was also a musician. This led to the founding of the Starmus Festival. The name pays homage to stars and music. The first Festival would occur four years later.

2011 Starmus Festival, "Starmus I" 
The first Starmus Festival took place from 20 to 25 June 2011 on Tenerife and La Palma, Canary Islands. The primary site of the event was the Ritz-Carlton Abama Hotel in Tenerife. The theme was "50 Years of Man in Space." The Festival presented the rare opportunity for delegates, as the attendees were called, to share time, speak with, share refreshments, and converse with the speakers. About 300 people attended Starmus I.

During the festival, Neil Armstrong talked about Starmus and our future on Earth; Buzz Aldrin spoke about possible future missions to Mars; Alexei Leonov described the early days of the Soviet space program and his historic first spacewalk; Brian May asked about future human exploration in space and whether humans should first clean up their act here on Earth.

Further exploring themes of space exploration, Cosmonaut Viktor Gorbatko recalled early Soviet missions; Apollo 8 astronaut Bill Anders related details of the early American space program; Apollo 13 astronaut Jim Lovell described the harrowing mission he endured returning that crippled spacecraft to Earth; and Apollo 16 astronaut Charles Duke described his adventures in the Apollo program.

Covering themes of life in the universe, Nobel Prize-winning chemist Jack W. Szostak outlined the origin of life on Earth; Richard Dawkins described evolution and exobiology; astronomer Michel Mayor recalled extrasolar planets including his own first discovery; and Jill Tarter explored extraterrestrial intelligence in the universe.

Astrophysics and cosmology received straight coverage in a variety of talks, as with descriptions of supernovae and gamma ray bursts by astrophysicist Adam Burrows; the acoustic nature of the universe by Garik Israelian; black holes by astrophysicist Kip Thorne; the creation of the universe by cosmologist Joseph Silk; cosmic signals from the beginning by cosmologist George Smoot; and five cosmic breakthroughs of the past 50 years by astronomer Robert Williams.

Talks involving technology were also given, as with technologist Rich Goldman's description of the relationship between space exploration and technology; physicist Sami Solanki’s exploration of whether the Sun is causing global warming; and astronomer Leslie Sage’s description of how astronomy has changed what it means to be human.

Finally, several talks focused on the new era of spacefarers, with cosmonaut Sergei Zhukov’s presentation on the future of Russian space exploration; Swiss astronaut Claude Nicollier’s recollections of orbiting on the space shuttle; and cosmonaut Yuri Baturin’s plea for space explorers to help to change Earth and its inhabitants for the better.

The event also highlighted a "108 Minute Round Table Discussion" with several of the speakers, seated underneath the 10.4-meter Gran Telescopio Canarias, in homage to the length of the first space mission, flown by Yuri Gagarin.

Starmus I also featured a spectacular concert event featuring Edgar Froese and Tangerine Dream, along with Brian May who joined the concert for several songs. The show was recorded.

An astrophotography competition was opened for astronomy enthusiasts, and Alex Cherney won the prize, on the Gran Telescopio Canarias to make an image with the world's largest optical telescope.

In 2014, Canopus Publishing Ltd. produced a book consisting of the transcripts of the Starmus talks, numerous illustrations, and other materials. Titled Starmus: 50 Years of Man in Space, the volume featured a foreword by Stephen Hawking. Editors in Chief Garik Israelian and Brian May were assisted in the book's production by Executive Editor David J. Eicher and by Editorial Director Robin Rees. The volume was dedicated to Alexei Leonov and to Neil Armstrong, who died a year after the Festival took place but before the book was released.

2014 Starmus Festival, "Starmus II" 
The second Starmus Festival occurred from 22 to 27 September 2014, again on Tenerife and La Palma, Canary Islands. This time the theme was "Beginnings: The Making of the Modern Cosmos." Again, the primary site of the event was the Ritz-Carlton Abama Hotel in Tenerife.

This time aided by greater publicity, the number of Starmus delegates swelled to nearly 1,000. Talks at Starmus II included Nobel Prize winning astronomer Robert Wilson describing his joint discovery of the cosmic microwave background radiation; Astronomy magazine Editor in Chief David J. Eicher asking whether the revolution in factual knowledge about the universe is being swamped by sci-fi and entertainment nonsense; Alexei Leonov speaking to the crowd about his space exploration experiences; and Richard Dawkins outlining what potential alien life forms might be like.

Talks also included an address by Brian May on stereo imaging of astronomical objects, with 3D glasses; and Stephen Hawking lecturing on the origin of the universe. Nobel Prize winning astrophysicist John Mather then foreshadowed science to come with the James Webb Space Telescope. The audience then screened a film, 51 Degrees North, with words by the film's director, Grigorij Richters, who received musical contributions by May in the film. Hawking later delivered a second lecture on black holes.

More presentations followed, with Apollo 16 astronaut Charles Duke describing his scientific procedures on the lunar surface during the mission; Nobel Prize winning chemist Harry Kroto then described his career and development of carbon nanochemistry; and Apollo 7 astronaut Walter Cunningham wondered about the future of exploration and the lack of a risk-taking, adventurous culture in the current world.

As with Starmus I, Starmus II also highlighted a "108 Minute Round Table Discussion" with several of the speakers, seated underneath the 10.4-m Gran Telescopio Canarias, in homage to the length of the first space mission, flown by Yuri Gagarin.

The second Starmus also featured a Sonic Universe Concert, this time featuring Rick Wakeman, celebrated for his years in the rock band Yes, and his current band. They were joined for several songs by Brian May, and again the whole performance was recorded.

A final celebration occurred as a tribute to Alexei Leonov, and featured Leonov writing and explaining some of his work on a large auditorium chalkboard. Moreover, the event also featured musical contributions by Cypriot soprano Katerina Mina and Greek composer and musician Alexandros Hahalis.

The Government of Tenerife has announced that the equivalent publicity value from Starmus Festival II (2014) exceeds 170 Mln. Euros and that the festival has reached to 2.4 Bln. people worldwide.

2016 Starmus Festival, "Starmus III" 
The third STARMUS festival took place in 2016 in the Canary Islands, on Tenerife and La Palma from 27 June to 2 July. The theme of the third festival was: Beyond The Horizon: A Tribute To Stephen Hawking.

As was the case with the previous two festivals, the third STARMUS festival grew in attendance with over 1200 delegates attending. The festival was not lacking presenters either; STARMUS III featured the most high-profile scientists and science communicators in the world, including: Stephen Hawking, Neil deGrasse Tyson, Roger Penrose, Brian Cox, Richard Dawkins, Brian Greene, Kip Thorne, Garik Israelian, Martin Rees, Chris Hadfield, Alexei Leonov, Rusty Schweickart, Jill Tarter, Carolyn Porco, and Joel Parker. The festival also featured Eleven Nobel Prize laureates: David Gross, Joseph Stiglitz, Adam Riess, Brian Schmidt, Robert Wilson, François Englert, Eric Betzig, Carol W. Greider, Elizabeth Blackburn, Edvard Moser and May-Britt Moser.

In addition to the scientists in attendance the festival also featured a vast array of musical talent including: keynote speaker Brian Eno, Hans Zimmer, Brian May, Sarah Brightman, Anathema, the Symphonic Orchestra of Tenerife, and MC Hawking.

Other notable attendees included David Zambuka, writers Robert J. Sawyer and Anthony McCarten, and visual effects supervisor Paul Franklin.

STARMUS III was also the location of the inaugural awards ceremony for recipients of the Stephen Hawking Medal for Science Communication. The award recipients (chosen by Hawking himself) were composer Hans Zimmer, physicist Jim Al-Khalili and the science documentary Particle Fever.

The festival closed with the Sonic Universe Concert featuring Sarah Brightman singing with the Symphonic Orchestra of Tenerife as conducted by Hans Zimmer. The concert also featured performances by Chris Hadfield, Rick Wakeman, Brian May, and Anathema.

2017 Starmus Festival, "Starmus IV" 

The fourth STARMUS festival took place in 2017 in Trondheim, Norway, from 18 to 23 June. The theme of the fourth festival was: Life and the Universe, and the festival featured eleven Nobel Prize laureates and many astronomers, biologists, chemists, economists, astronauts and artists.

Among the Starmus IV delegates were space explorers Charles Duke who spoke on the legacy of Apollo 16, Sandra Magnus who gave an account of her experience during her missions, Harrison Schmitt, from Apollo 17, the last mission to the Moon, who offered insights into future space missions, and Terry Virts who discussed the perspectives on Earth and our place in the Universe.

Many outstanding scientists and Nobel Prize laureates attended Starmus IV and gave presentations on a variety of topics. Michel Mayor discussed exoplanets and exoEarths, Sara Seager raised the issue of biosignatures on exoplanets, Lynn Rothschild continued the topic by exploring the most extreme environments where alien life could be found. George Smoot made a presentation on cosmic connection, Adam Riess discussed evidence on the acceleration of the Universe from observing supernovae, physicist and mathematician Brian Greene talked about String Theory and the fabric of spacetime, Martin Rees’ talk dwelt upon the future of the Earth, Priyamvada Natarajan gave a presentation on the dark side of the Universe, and Jill Tarter spoke about technology and its resemblance to magic – or nature.

Physicist and director of Max Planck Institute Stefan Hell’s talk was dedicated to the revolutionary changes in optical microscopy, Stephen Hawking offered an exploration of the future of the humanity (he gave his talk via VoIP connection, as he had not been able to attend the festival due to health issues) and Lisa Randall spoke about dark matter and the dinosaurs, while physicist and programmer Jaan Tallinn highlighted issues of steering artificial intelligence.

Apart from outstanding physicists and astronomers, Starmus IV hosted biologists Nancy Knowlton, with a talk on the life on Planet Ocean, and Paul Hebert, with a discussion of a mission on planetary diversity, climate change scientist Katharine Hayhoe who explored the facts and myths of climate change, microbiologist and biochemist Emmanuelle Charpentier who talked about CRISPR-Cas9, a gene editing technology that revolutionises life sciences, biochemist and writer Nick Lane who offered insights into understanding the planetary life support systems, psychologist and neuroscientist Edvard Moser who gave a talk on the brain’s positioning system, physiologist Susumu Tonegawa who unveiled the mechanisms of the human memory, economists Chris Pissarides, with a presentation on work in the age of robots, Finn Kydland, with a talk on innovation, capital formation and economic policy, and Jeffrey Sachs, who gave a talk called How we can survive Trump, Climate Change and other Global Crises?

A number of concerts and performances were given at Starmus IV by outstanding musicians and artists. Steve Vai shared his creative manifestation, and David Zambuka made an impressive show entitled "Get a Life (form)!" May-Britt Moser and Trondheim Soloists offered an art-science project called Into Whiteness. The Trondheim Symphonic Orchestra gave a number of concerts with Ane Brun, Steve Vai and Brian Greene, while Steve Vai gave another concert with Nuno Bettancourt, Grace Potter and Devin Townsend as special guests. The musical part also involved The Pineapple Thief, Trondheim Symphonic Orchestra and Jennie Abrahamson.

Robin Ince and Brian Cox hosted a panel with Charles Duke, Sandra Magnus, Terry Virts and Claude Nicollier.

Starmus IV featured a wide range of round tables and discussions on different topics, among them the traditional 108-minute panel, this time called 108 minutes: The World on Fire, with Neil deGrasse Tyson, Eugene Kaspersky, Finn Kydland, Oliver Stone, Chris Pissarides as speakers and Larry King as moderator. Larry King also moderated the round table Space Journalism 360: New Era and gave a presentation on the era of post-truth and fake news.

Another panel discussion dealt with the issues of outreach and education and was moderated by David Eicher, with Torsten Wiesel, Alexandra Witze, Susan Bailey, Claude Nicollier, Markus Reymann, Sandra Magnus, May-Britt Moser and Ane Brun as speakers.

Nobel Prize Laureate panel discussion with the 11 Nobel Prize winners attending Starmus IV featured May-Britt Moser, Robert Wilson, Edvard Moser, George Smoot, Adam Riess, Finn Kydland, Susumu Tonegawa, Chris Pissarides, Torsten Wiesel, Tim Hunt and Stefan Hell.

In a discussion called Moonwalkers in conversation, moderated by Neil deGrasse Tyson, Buzz Aldrin, Harrison Schmitt and Charles Duke shared their experience on the surface of the Earth's satellite.

The film The Spacewalker about Alexei Leonov was shown for the first time. Film director Oliver Stone explained how to decode truth in films.

The Star Party featured DJ Artone, DJ Favorite, DJ BK Duke.

During Starmus IV, the Stephen Hawking Medal award ceremony took place. Stephen Hawking selects the winners for their outstanding contribution in science communication and they are awarded a medal designed by Alexei Leonov. Starmus IV winners were: Neil deGrasse Tyson (science writing), Jean-Michel Jarre (music and arts) and The Big Bang Theory (films).

2019 Starmus Festival, "Starmus V" 

The fifth Festival took place in 2019 in Zurich, Switzerland under the general theme "A Giant Leap", dedicated to the first step of the man on the Moon. Coinciding with the 50th anniversary of Apollo 11 landing on the Moon and the 60th anniversary of the first man-made object hitting the Moon's surface, the Festival commemorated those events through lectures, presentations, debates, panel discussions and performances.

The festival opened with Hans Zimmer's homage to the Apollo Missions, Once Upon a Time on the Moon. The musical component of the festival also featured Brian May, Rick Wakeman, Steve Vai and other stars. Nobel laureate physicist Kip Thorne together with Paul Franklin and Oliver James (DNEG) presented a visual sequence based on state-of-the-art astrophysics research.

The Stephen Hawking Medal was awarded to Elon Musk, Buzz Aldrin, Brian Eno and the documentary Apollo 11, screened during the festival for the first time in Europe.

Dedicated to the humanity's first step on the Moon and Apollo missions, Starmus V featured Apollo astronauts Buzz Aldrin, Al Worden, Charles Duke, Harrison Schmitt, Rusty Schweickart, Walter Cunningham joined by ESA and NASA astronauts Helen Sharman, Sandra Magnus, Nicole Stott, Claude Nicollier, Tim Peake, Garrett Reisman, and Russian astronauts Gennadiy Padalka and Yuri Baturin.
 
Nobel Prize Laureates Donna Strickland, Edvard Moser, Samuel Ting, Elizabeth Blackburn, May-Britt Moser, Adam Riess, Robert Wilson, George Smoot, Brian Schmidt, Barry Barish and Eric Betzig joined the traditional discussion panel to debate on pressing issues of space exploration and the prospects of humanity in space. Another traditional panel titled 108 Minutes featured Harrison Schmitt, Charles Duke, Brian Eno, Bill Nye, May-Britt Moser, Donna Strickland, Garik Israelian, Michael Hintze, Al Worden and Gerry Griffin.

A constellation of scientists, artists and astronauts shared their discoveries during six full days, through lectures, panel discussions, concerts, and a new genre in science communication, the concert-lecture, by May-Britt Moser.

2022 Starmus Festival, "Starmus VI" 

The Starmus festival (Starmus VI) was planned to be held between 6 and 11 September 2021 in Yerevan, Armenia. However, the event was postponed until September 2022, due to the COVID-19 pandemic and related travel restrictions.

Starmus VI took place between 5 and 10 September 2022 in Yerevan. The main focus of the sixth Starmus Festival titled "50 years on Mars" is the exploration of Mars: from the very first Soviet MARS 3 to the ambitious manned landing plans and spectacular NASA missions. It has been 50 years since MARS 3 performed the first soft landing on the Red Planet and sent back to the Earth the first image of its surface. This milestone was followed by dozens of successful missions by NASA providing us with more accurate images and information from our neighbour in the Solar System.

The 2022 Starmus festival also featured James Bagian, the first Armenian astronaut.

The Festival was addressed pressing issues and showed screen films about the exploration of Mars and Space. This time, the documentary film "Space Inside" about the outstanding Soviet and Russian cosmonaut Alexei Leonov was shown. It was introduced by the cosmonaut's daughter, Oksana Leonova. It is based on the last interview of an outstanding pioneer, in which he talks about his amazing fate and that a person has the right to challenge the cosmos outside and inside himself. The 80-minute film uses footage from the Soviet history of space exploration, documentary chronicles. Extraordinary situations that a person may encounter are described, as Leonov encountered during his first spacewalk. The film also touches on the theme of the astronaut's artistic talent: he was called the best artist among astronauts and the best astronaut among artists.

More than 50 scientists and cosmonauts came here: Chris Hadfield, social media-sensation; Charles Duke (Apollo 16), the youngest man to walk on the moon; James Bagian, a former astronaut of Armenian descent; Charles Bolden Jr., the former head of NASA; Tony Fadell, iPod creator; Brian Greene, physicist and science communicator. In addition, Starmus has featured a wide selection of Nobel Laureate scientists such as Kip Thorne, Emmanuelle Charpentier, Donna Strickland.

Among the artists who performed at the festival in Yerevan were rock legends Brian May (he is the member of the Starmus Festival Board of Directors ), Rick Wakeman, Serj Tankian, Derek Sherinian with Sons of Apollo, opera singer Montserrat Martí, Andrey Makarevich, Tigran Hamasyan, Armenian National Philharmonic Orchestra, Jivan Gasparyan - junior, Children and Youth Choir of the Tavush diocese.

Brian May, Jane Goodall, Diane Ackerman and the NASA Communications Unit announced as Winners of the Stephen Hawking Medal at Starmus VI Armenia at the official opening of the festival at the Karen Demirchyan Sports and Concerts Complex on September 5.

The festival included several forms and directions. Among them were large-scale concerts and presentations: "Sonic Universe concert" with the participation of the Prime Minister of Armenia Nikol Pashinyan, prominent scientists and artists, as well as the "Another World" concert, where world music stars gathered, performing several hits by "Queen" together. Brian May played an electric guitar solo. So, on September 7, "Queen" guitarist Brian May teamed up with "System Of A Down" frontman Serj Tankian, "Sons Of Apollo" vocalist Jeff Scott Soto, Graham Gouldman and opera singer Montserrat Martí to perform the "Queen" classic "The Show Must Go On" with the Armenian National Orchestra.

A school of astrophotography, a conference "Discover space and change the world" were organized, in which leading researchers and scientists from various fields delivered mass lectures from the stage of the sports and concert complex named after K. Demirchyan.

The role of scientists in preserving peace, scientific ethics, including in the post-COVID period, the responsibility of scientists to humanity were discussed at the round table in the Zvartnots temple "108 minutes of Gagarin" (according to the duration of the flight of the first cosmonaut) and at the panel discussion "Andrey Sakharov - 100" (the centenary of the Soviet scientist was celebrated in 2021).

At the campsite near the Yerevan Opera Theatre, the Starmus scientific camp  was set up - a tent city for schoolchildren and students. Here they were read entertaining lectures, showed experiments on astrophysics, laser technologies, unmanned vehicles and robotics, talked about agronomy, how to deal with epidemics. It also hosted concerts by artists from all over the world.

The Festival featured several pieces of music dedicated to the exploration of Mars and space in general. So, Rick Wakeman performed insrumental version "Life on Mars?" at the Sonic Universe Concert on September 5. It's a song by English singer-songwriter David Bowie, first released on his 1971 album "Hunky Dory". Piano was played by Strawbs member Rick Wakeman.

At the closing of the expanded program of the Starmus festival on September 11, at the site of the scientific camp near the Yerevan Opera Theatre, the neo-symphony "March of Mars" by the participant of the international social and cultural public initiative "Human Time" composer of Armenian origin Tigran Jager was performed. It became the only new composition dedicated directly to the theme of the exploration of Mars and prepared for the festival in Yerevan. "In my march-neosymphony, I reflected the idea that Mars has become a measure of the development of human civilization – not only technological, but also ethical. This planet, which for centuries has symbolized the god of war, should finally become the point of transition to nuclear-free energy and conflict-free information, reason and wisdom,” Tigran Jager described the idea of his work.

Other dedications to the theme of space exploration were instrumental tracks by Serj Tankian (System of a Down) and Brian Eno, released in the fall of 2021. They paid a tribute to Alexander Kemurdzhian, soviet-armenian engineer who designed first planetary rovers Lunokhod and Mars Rover Prop-M.

Starmus co-founder Garik Israelian said: "Armenia has played an extraordinary role in the past, present and future of how we understand and explore our universe, and I'm looking forward to welcome this extraordinary range of thinkers and creatives to encounter this special place and share ideas."

The festival was hold under the high patronage of the President of Armenia (9 April 2018 – 1 February 2022), Dr. Armen Sarkissian. He has invited Starmus to Armenia during his invited speech in 2019 at the opening ceremony of Starmus in Zurich. The Government of Armenia has supported and worked in partnership with organizers to make the festival an outstanding event. The Ministry of Education, Science, Culture and Sports and the Ministry of High-Tech Industry played an important role in different educational, scientific and artistic activities of the festival.

The Festival Starmus in Yerevan was supported by UNESCO.

Sonic Universe Concerts 
Open to the general public at large as well as the Starmus Festival delegates, the two Sonic Universe Concerts were held at the Magma Arte & Congresos, an arena in Tenerife. The first concert in 2011 featured Edgar Froese and Tangerine Dream, along with Brian May. Their performance was recorded and produced into a CD entitled "Starmus - Sonic Universe" in 2011 and is the only album to highlight both Tangerine Dream and Brian May. The second concert in 2014 featured Rick Wakeman and his band, accompanied by May. Progressive rock band Nosound also performed in 2014 at Starmus II, with this show recorded and produced into a CD/DVD set entitled Teide 2390. The Starmus II performance was special as it is the band's first full, live, recorded album.

Star Party 
Each of the first two Starmus Festivals featured a star party with many participants traveling to the summit of Mt. Teide on Tenerife for dark sky observing. In addition to observing a variety of deep-sky objects with an array of telescopes, participants were entertained by the Italian progressive rock band Nosound.

Astrophotography School 
The 2014 Starmus featured a small astrophotography school for enthusiasts who wanted to learn about imaging the sky and also have access to one of the darkest skies on Earth with their own equipment. For three days following the main Festival, on 28–30 September 2014, participants stayed at the observatories on Mt. Teide on Tenerife, and seminars took place featuring noted astroimagers Damian Peach and Rogelio Bernal Andreo, along with Astronomy Magazine Editor in Chief David J. Eicher.

Books and DVDs
In 2014 Starmus published its first book: Starmus: 50 Years of Man in Space. An ambitious series of talks, articles and recollections assembled to celebrate the human exploration of space. It is the result of the unique Starmus meeting in 2011 on Tenerife, where the legendary Russian and American pioneers of the space age met up for the first time to share the moments that electrified the human race. Neil Armstrong, Buzz Aldrin, Bill Anders, Yuri Baturin, Charles Duke, Victor Gorbatko, Alexei Leonov, Jim Lovell, Claude Nicollier, and Sergei Zhukov tell their personal stories about the first space walk, the lunar landing, the heroic recovery of Apollo 13, the repair of the Hubble Space Telescope, and much more.

In 2016 Starmus published its second book: Origins of the Cosmos. Edited by Garik Israelian and Brian May, the book synthesizes our current view of the universe. Written in a style that is understandable to anyone who is interested in these matters, it includes contributions from many prominent figures of the science world, including Alexei Leonov, Walt Cunningham, Richard Dawkins, David Eicher, John Ellis, Katerina Harvati, Stephen Hawking, Harry Kroto, Mark Boslough, John Mather, and Robert Wilson.

In 2014 Rick Wakeman released a DVD called Rick Wakeman and Brian May – Starmus 2014. Rick Wakeman has made several appearances at Starmus. The DVD was recorded at the second Starmus festival in 2014 where he was joined on stage by Brian May, the guitarist from Queen.

References

External links 
 

Tourist attractions in Tenerife
Astronomy events
Festivals in Spain
Science events in Spain